Philip Booth is a British economist. He is Dean of the Faculty of Education, Humanities and Social Sciences at St Mary's University, Twickenham, and Senior Academic Fellow at the Institute of Economic Affairs. His primary areas of research and writing are social insurance, financial regulation and Catholic social teaching.

Early life
Philip Booth graduated from Durham University (Hatfield College), with a Bachelor of Arts degree in economics. He then received a PhD from City University London.

Career
He began his career working in the Investment Department of Axa Equity and Law (1985–1988). During the 1990s he led a number of projects developing insurance, finance and actuarial science teaching in Central and Eastern Europe with Dr. Krzysztof Stroiński. He worked for the Bank of England as a special adviser on financial stability issues from 1999–2002. He was head of the Department of Real Estate Finance and Investment in City University from 2000–2001 and Associate Dean of City University Business School (now Cass Business School) from 2001. In May 2015, he was appointed as a Professor of Finance, Public Policy and Ethics at St Mary's University, Twickenham.

He joined the IEA in September 2002, where he serves as the Editorial and Programme Director. He was Vice chairman of the Public Sector Pensions Commission, an initiative set up by the Institute of Economic Affairs, the Institute of Directors and others in December 2009. The Commission released its final report in July 2010.

He has written widely on pensions, social insurance and financial regulation. He is author, co-author and editor of several books and think tank publications. He is the editor of the journal Economic Affairs. He is also the Associate Editor of the Annals of Actuarial Science and the British Actuarial Journal, and Assistant Editor of the Journal of Property Research.

He was a Fellow of Blackfriars Hall, Oxford University, from 2010 to 2011. He is a Fellow of the Institute of Actuaries, a Fellow of the Royal Statistical Society and an Honorary Member of the Society of Actuaries of Poland.

Bibliography
Booth P M, D. Besar, K. K. Chan, A.K.L. Milne, J. Pickles (2010 forthcoming), 'Systemic Risk in Financial Services', British Actuarial Journal 
Booth P M (ed) (2010), 'Christian Perspectives on the Financial Crash', London: St Pauls
Booth P M, Arthur T G (2010), 'Does Britain Need a Financial Regulator? Statutory regulation, private regulation and financial markets', London: Institute of Economic Affairs
Booth P M (ed) (2009), 'Verdict on the Crash: Causes and Policy Implications', ed. Hobart Paperback, London, UK: Institute of Economic Affairs
Booth P M (2009), 'Learning from the crash, and teaching after it' in Samuel Gregg and James Stoner (ed.), Profit, Prudence and Virtue: essays in ethics and business management, UK and US: Imprint Academic
Booth P M, Wellings R (2009), 'Introductory chapter in Globalization and Free Trade' in Philip Booth and Richard Wellings (ed.), UK: Edward Elgar
Booth P M, Wellings R (ed) (2009), 'Globalization and Free Trade', UK: Edward Elgar
Booth P (2008), 'The young held to ransom – a public choice analysis of the UK state pension system', Economic Affairs, 28(3)
Booth P M (2008), 'Market Failure: a failed paradigm', Economic Affairs, 28(4)
Booth P M (2008), 'Modern Business and its Moral and Ethical Dilemmas in a Globalized World' in Ian Harper and Samuel Gregg (ed.), Christian Theology and Market Economics, UK: Edward Elgar
Booth P. M. (2007), '"Freedom with Publicity" – the actuarial profession and insurance regulation from 1844–1945', Annals of Actuarial Science, 2(1)
Booth P. M., Morrison A. (2007), 'Regulatory Competition and Life Insurance Solvency Regulation in the EU and the USA', North American Actuarial Journal, 11
Booth (ed) P. M. (2007), 'Catholic Social Teaching and the Market Economy', Institute of Economic Affairs, Hobart Paperback 34
Booth P.M., Whetstone L. (2007), 'Half a Cheer for Fair Trade', Economic Affairs, 27(2)
Booth P, Kent Matthews (ed) (2006), 'Issues in Monetary Policy: the relationship between money and financial markets', UK: Wiley
Booth P. M. (ed) (2006), 'Were 364 Economists All Wrong?', London, UK: Institute of Economic Affairs
Booth P. M., Meadowcroft J. (ed) (2006), 'The Road to Economic Freedom (two volumes)', Edward Elgar
Booth P M (ed) (2006), 'Towards a Liberal Utopia (second edition)', ed. 2nd, Continuum
Booth P, Deborah Cooper (2005), 'The Way Out of the Pensions Quagmire', Institute of Economic Affairs, Research Monograph(60)
Booth P, Gl Marcato (2004), 'The Measurement and Modelling of Commercial Real Estate Performance', British Actuarial Journal, 10(1)
Booth P. M., A. Adams, D. Bowie, D. Freeth and P. England (2003), 'Investment Mathematics', Wiley 
Booth P. M., A. T. Adams and B. D. MacGregor (2003), 'Lease Terms, Option Pricing and the Financial Characteristics of Property', British Actuarial Journal, 9(3)
Booth P. M., D. E. P. Walsh (2001), 'The Application of Financial Theory to the Pricing of Upward Only Rent Reviews', Journal of Property Research, 18(1),
Booth P. M., D. E. P. Walsh (2001), 'An Option Pricing Approach to Valuing Upward Only Rent Review Properties with Multiple Reviews', Insurance: Mathematics and Economics, 28(2)
Booth P. M., Y. Yakoubov (2000), 'Investment Policy for Defined Contribution Pension Schemes Close to Retirement: an Analysis of the "Lifestyle" Concept', North American Actuarial Journal, 4(2)
Booth P. M. (2000), 'Caring for the Long Term', Politeia, London, UK
Booth P. M., G. Dickinson (1998), 'The Insurance Solution' in Tom Sorrell (ed.), Chapter in Health Insurance and Ethics, Routledge, London, U.K.
Booth P, J. N. Allan, R. J. Verrall and D. E. P. Walsh (1998), 'The Management of Risk in Banking', British Actuarial Journal, 4(4)
Booth P. M. (1998), 'The Transition from Social Insecurity', Economic Affairs, 18(1)
Booth P (1998), 'The Problems with PAYGO Pensions', Journal of Pensions Management, 4(3)
Booth P. M. (1997), 'The Political Economy of Regulation', British Actuarial Journal, 3(3)
Booth P., A. Adams, D. Bloomfield, and P. England (1993), 'Investment Mathematics and Statistics', Kluwer Academic Publishers

References

External links

Living people
Alumni of City, University of London
Academics of City, University of London
Academics of Bayes Business School
Academics of St Mary's University, Twickenham
British economists
1964 births
Alumni of Hatfield College, Durham